Planèzes is a commune in the Pyrénées-Orientales department in southern France.

Geography 
Planèzes is located in the canton of La Vallée de l'Agly and in the arrondissement of Perpignan. Planèzes is part of the Fenouillèdes.

Toponymy 
In occitan, the name of the commune is Planeses.

Population

See also
Communes of the Pyrénées-Orientales department

External links 
Planèzes

References

Communes of Pyrénées-Orientales
Fenouillèdes